La bonne aventure (Fortune telling) was a French-Canadian soap opera TV series which ran from 1982 to 1986 for a total of 143 episodes. It became one of the more popular and successful television series in Quebec during its tenure.

Cast

Nathalie Gascon as Martine Poliquin
Christiane Pasquier as Anne Demers-Leroux
Joanne Côté as Hélène Savoie
Michelle Léger as Michèle Dalpé-Martin
Jean-René Ouellet as Hubert Girard
Serge Dupire as Benoît Leroux

External links

Television shows filmed in Quebec
Ici Radio-Canada Télé original programming
Téléromans
1982 Canadian television series debuts
1986 Canadian television series endings
1980s Canadian drama television series